Mohamed Mansour can refer to:
 Mohamed Mansour (businessman) (born 1948), Egyptian billionaire businessman with the Mansour Group
 Mohamed Mansour (athlete), Libyan athlete
 Mohamed Mansour Hassan, Egyptian businessman and senior member of the Democratic Front Party
 Mohamed Mansour Salah (born 1957), a Qatari athlete
 Mohammed Mansour Jabarah (born 1981), a Kuwaiti terrorist
 Mohamed Moukrim Ben Mansour (born 1938), Moroccan Olympic wrestler